The 1994–95 season of the Venezuelan Primera División, the top category of Venezuelan football, was played by 16 teams. The national champions were Caracas.

Torneo Iniciación

Group A

Group B

Group C

Group D

Torneo Nacional

Group A

Group B

Torneo Finalización

External links
Venezuela 1994 season at RSSSF

Venezuelan Primera División seasons
Ven
Ven
1994–95 in Venezuelan football